Tales of Sword and Sorcery Featuring Dagar the Invincible is a comic-book series created by writer Donald F. Glut and artist Jesse Santos for Western Publishing's Gold Key Comics line.

Publication history
The first issue had the cover date of October 1972. The series was published on a quarterly schedule and only 18 issues were produced. The final issue appeared with a cover date of December 1976 and reprinted the first issue. Later on, a new story appeared in Gold Key Spotlight #6, in July 1977. Whitman later published a reprint issue, #19, in April, 1982.

In fall of 2011, Dark Horse Comics started a hardcover archive reprint series. The first volume reprinted #1–9.

Series history
Dagar was a sword and sorcery series, set in a mythical past of warriors and wizards. There were a few secondary characters (Durak in #7, 12, 13; Torgus in #9, 10, 13). Durak originally appeared as "Duroc" in Mystery Comics Digest #7, 14 and 15, then was renamed for his debut in Dagar the Invincible.

Don Glut also tied in his other Gold Key characters such as Tragg and Doctor Spektor. In #5, Tragg's Neanderthal brother Jarn appeared. Tragg cameoed in issue #11. In issue #13, the story actually crossed over into and was concluded in issue #15 of The Occult Files of Dr. Spektor.

References

External links
 Interview with Don Glut, focusing on Dagar

Gold Key Comics characters
Fantasy comics
Fictional swordfighters in comics